Ştefan Rusu (born 2 February 1956) is a retired Greco-Roman wrestler from Romania. He competed at the 1976, 1980 and 1984 Olympics and won a silver, a gold and a bronze medal, respectively. He also won world titles in different weight divisions in 1978 and 1982 and European titles in 1978–1981 and 1985. After retiring from competitions he worked as a wrestling coach in Romania and in Turkey.

References

External links 
 
 
 

1956 births
Living people
Olympic wrestlers of Romania
Wrestlers at the 1976 Summer Olympics
Wrestlers at the 1980 Summer Olympics
Wrestlers at the 1984 Summer Olympics
Romanian male sport wrestlers
Olympic gold medalists for Romania
Olympic silver medalists for Romania
Olympic bronze medalists for Romania
Olympic medalists in wrestling
Medalists at the 1984 Summer Olympics
Medalists at the 1980 Summer Olympics
Medalists at the 1976 Summer Olympics
Universiade medalists in wrestling
Universiade silver medalists for Romania
European Wrestling Championships medalists
World Wrestling Championships medalists
Medalists at the 1977 Summer Universiade
20th-century Romanian people